Carlos Iván Nava Ramírez (born July 14, 1994, in Guadalajara, Jalisco) is a Mexican professional footballer who plays for Gavilanes de Matamoros.

External links
 

Liga MX players
Living people
1994 births
Mexican footballers
Association football midfielders
Atlas F.C. footballers
Altamira F.C. players
Tampico Madero F.C. footballers
Alebrijes de Oaxaca players
Tuxtla F.C. footballers
Yalmakán F.C. footballers
Ascenso MX players
Liga Premier de México players
Tercera División de México players
Footballers from Guadalajara, Jalisco